Zanjan County is in Zanjan province, Iran. The capital of the county is the city of Zanjan. At the 2006 census, the county's population was 442,728 in 113,883 households. The following census in 2011 counted 486,495 people in 137,832 households. At the 2016 census, the county's population was 521,302 in 159,020 households.

Administrative divisions

The population history and structural changes of Zanjan County's administrative divisions over three consecutive censuses are shown in the following table. The latest census shows three districts, 13 rural districts, and three cities.

References

 

Counties of Zanjan Province